"Dulce Amor" ("Sweet Love") is a 1995 song by Cuban American singer-songwriter Gloria Estefan, released as the second promotional single and fourth single overall from her second Spanish-language album, Abriendo Puertas. It was a promotional single only sent to Mexico and Spain to promote the album, and has strong vallenato influences.

Charts

References

External links
Lyrics with English translation

1996 singles
Gloria Estefan songs
Spanish-language songs
Songs written by Kike Santander
1995 songs
Epic Records singles